Lee Holloway (December 4, 1946 - March 14, 2018) was an American social worker and politician who served two terms as chairman of the Milwaukee County Board of Supervisors. From December 28, 2010 to February 4, 2011, Lee Holloway served as Acting County Executive of Milwaukee County, Wisconsin.

Background
Holloway was a lifelong Milwaukee resident, self-described as "the product of blue-collar, working-class people" (both his parents worked in factories for many years). He graduated from Lincoln High School, where he played football and earned an athletic scholarship to the University of Arkansas, from which he graduated in 1969. By 1972, he'd returned to Milwaukee and earned an M.S. in developmental disabilities from the University of Wisconsin–Milwaukee.

He worked as a guidance counselor at Messmer High School before going into administration of social service agencies, including 4C's of Milwaukee County, the Inner City Development Project – North, and Milwaukee Comprehensive Community Health, of which he was the president and CEO.

Politics
Holloway ran for mayor of Milwaukee in 1988, losing in the initial non-partisan primary to John Norquist and Martin Schreiber; he says that while he wasn't very political, he felt that there should be an African-American in the race. Four years later, he ran for county supervisor, winning that race and being re-elected from 1996–2008.

When county executive Scott Walker was elected Governor of Wisconsin, Walker vacated the office of Milwaukee County Executive on December 28, 2010.  In order to minimize disruptions caused by the vacancy, Lee Holloway, as chairman of the Milwaukee County Board of Supervisors, immediately assumed the office of Milwaukee County Executive, but was required, by law, to appoint an Interim County Executive within 30 days of assuming office.  On January 25, 2011, Lee Holloway appointed Marvin Pratt, who was sworn in as Interim County Executive on February 4, 2011.

Personal life
Holloway and his wife Lynda had four grown sons. The Holloways were the landlords for a number of rental properties in the City of Milwaukee, and had frequently clashed with city building inspectors over building code violations at these properties.

References

External links
 Official county website

1946 births
African-American people in Wisconsin politics
American social workers
2018 deaths
County supervisors in Wisconsin
Milwaukee County Executives
Politicians from Milwaukee
University of Arkansas alumni
University of Wisconsin–Milwaukee alumni
20th-century African-American people
21st-century African-American people